Siipiweikot is a Finnish restaurant chain founded in 1993 specialising in hot chicken wings, spicy sauces, french fries and beer. The Siipiweikot chain has five restaurants, of which two are located in Tampere, and one each in Helsinki, Espoo and Vantaa. Also the Prisma store in Pirkkala has a smaller bar-style establishment where wings can be bought as take-away.

Siipiweikot has become famous for furthering the hot wings culture in Finland, and its home city of Tampere has often been called "the wings capital of Finland". The restaurant menu also offers vegetarian options based on seitan. The Siipiweikot sauces are also sold for consumers in grocery stores.

The business of the restaurant chain is handled by the limited company Hot Wings Oy. In 2020 the company's revenue was 4.8 million euro, and the annual profit was 472 thousand euro. The current CEO of the company is Laura Yli-Houhala, who is the daughter of the company founder Pekka Yli-Houhala.

References

Restaurant chains in Finland
Companies based in Tampere
Restaurants established in 1993
1993 establishments in Finland